David Macarthur is an Australian philosopher and Professor of Philosophy at the University of Sydney who works primarily on skepticism, metaphysical quietism, pragmatism, liberal naturalism and philosophy of art (especially film, photography and architecture). He has taken up these and other themes in articles on the philosophy of Stanley Cavell, Hilary Putnam, Richard Rorty and Ludwig Wittgenstein. 

After completing a medical degree (M.B.B.S., 1988) and B.A. (1991, awarded with 1st-class Hons and University Medal) at the University of Sydney, he was awarded a Ph.D. in philosophy from Harvard University in 1999 under the supervision of Stanley Cavell, Hilary Putnam and Warren Goldfarb, with a thesis "Skeptical Reason & Inner Experience: A Re-Examination of the Problem of the External World." He then taught at Tufts University (1999–2000), before taking up a post-doctoral research fellowship at Macquarie University (2000–2003). Since 2003 he has been a member of the Philosophy Department at the University of Sydney.

Together with Mario De Caro, Macarthur has developed a new form of naturalism called liberal naturalism, as an alternative to scientific naturalism – which in one form or another is the orthodoxy within contemporary Anglo-American philosophy. Inspired primarily by Hilary Putnam and John McDowell, liberal naturalism attempts to overcome the wholesale Sellarsian elimination or replacement of the manifest image by the scientific image of the world. In order to achieve this aim, Macarthur has defended the viability and importance of non-scientific non-supernatural forms of understanding, especially concerning persons, language, art,  artefacts and their various relations to one another.

Books

Edited volumes 
 Macarthur, David and De Caro, Mario (Eds.) (2022). The Routledge Handbook of Liberal Naturalism. London: Routledge.
 Macarthur, David and Hetherington, Stephen (Eds.) (2022). Living Skepticism. Leiden: Brill. 
 Macarthur, David and De Caro, Mario (Eds.) (2022). Philosophy as Dialogue: Hilary Putnam. Cambridge, MA: Harvard University Press. 
 Macarthur, David (Ed.) (2017). Hilary Putnam & Ruth Anna Putnam, Pragmatism as a Way of Life: The Lasting Legacy of William James and John Dewey. Cambridge, MA: Harvard University Press. 
 Macarthur, David and De Caro, Mario (Eds.) (2012). Hilary Putnam: Philosophy in an Age of Science: Physics, Mathematics and Skepticism. Cambridge, MA: Harvard University Press. 
 Macarthur, David and De Caro, Mario (Eds.) (2010). Naturalism and Normativity. New York: Columbia University Press.
 Macarthur, David and De Caro, Mario (Eds.) (2004). Naturalism in Question. Cambridge, MA: Harvard University Press.

Articles (A Short Selection)
Macarthur, David (2020) “Rorty and (the End of) Metaphysics (?).” In The Blackwell Companion to Richard Rorty, Alan Malachawski (ed.). London: Wiley-Blackwell.
Macarthur, David (2019) “Difficulties of Reality, Skepticism and Moral Community: Remarks after Diamond on Cavell.” In Andrew Gleeson & Craig Taylor (eds.) Philosophy in a Realistic Spirit. London: Routledge, 176-193.
Macarthur, David (2017) “Wittgenstein on Art.” In Anat Matar (ed.) Understanding Wittgenstein, Understanding Modernism. London: Bloomsbury, 258–266.
Macarthur, David (2017) “A Vision of Blindness: Bladerunner and Moral Redemption.” Film-Philosophy: Special Issue on Cinematic Ethics. Ed. Robert Sinnerbrink, vol. 21 no. 3: 371–391. 
Macarthur, David (2016) “Metaphysical Quietism and Everyday Life.” In G. D’Oro & S. Overgaard (eds.), The Cambridge Companion to Philosophical Methodology. Cambridge: Cambridge University Press, 270–296.
Macarthur, David (2014) “Subject Naturalism, Scientism and the Problem of Linguistic Meaning: Critical Remarks on Price’s ‘Naturalism without Representationalism’.” Analisis (Spain), vol. 1 no. 1: 69–85. 
Macarthur, David (2014) “Cavell on Skepticism & the Importance of Not-Knowing”. Conversations: The Journal of Cavellian Studies, No. 2, (2014): 2–23, https://uottawa.scholarsportal.info/ojs/index.php/conversations/issue/view/222
Macarthur, David (2010) “Taking the Human Sciences Seriously.” In De Caro, M. & Macarthur, D. (eds.), Naturalism and Normativity. New York: Columbia University Press, 123–141.
Macarthur, David (2008) “Pragmatism, Metaphysical Quietism and the Problem of Normativity,” Philosophical Topics, vol. 36, no. 1: 193–207.
Macarthur, David & Price, Huw (2007) “Pragmatism, Quasi-realism and the Global Challenge.” In C. Misak (ed.), New Pragmatists. Oxford: Oxford University Press.
Macarthur, David (2003) “McDowell, Skepticism and the ‘Veil of Perception,” Australasian Journal of Philosophy, vol. 81: 175-190.

References

Academic staff of the University of Sydney
University of Sydney alumni
Australian expatriates in the United States
21st-century Australian male writers
21st-century Australian philosophers
Australian philosophers
Living people
Year of birth missing (living people)
Harvard University alumni